SIIMA Award for Best Male Debut – Telugu is presented by Vibri media group as part of its annual South Indian International Movie Awards, for the best acting done by an actor in a leading role in his debut Telugu film. The award was first given in 2012 for films released in 2011.

Superlatives

Winners

Nominations 

 2011: Aadi – Prema Kavali
 Mano Tej – Babloo
 Arvind Krishna – It's My Love Story
 Abijeet Duddala – Life is Beautiful
 Ajay – Nuvvila
 2012: Sudheer Babu – Siva Manasulo Sruthi
 Rahul Ravindran – Andala Rakshasi
 Naveen Chandra – Andala Rakshasi
 Sumanth Ashwin – Tuneega Tuneega
 Prince Cecil – Neeku Naaku Dash Dash
 2013: Raj Tarun – Uyyala Jampala
 Allu Sirish – Gouravam
 Mahat Raghavendra – Backbench Student
 Sree Vishnu – Prema Ishq Kaadhal
 Adivi Sesh– Kiss
 2014: Sai Dharam Tej – Pilla Nuvvu Leni Jeevitam
 Bellamkonda Sai Srinivas – Alludu Sreenu
 Sampoornesh Babu – Hrudaya Kaleyam
 Varun Tej – Mukunda
 Tejus Kancherla – Ulavacharu Biriyani
 2015: Akhil Akkineni – Akhil 
 Aakash Puri – Andhra Pori
 Parvatheesam – Kerintha
 Sathya Karthik – Tippu
 Vijay Deverakonda – Yevade Subramanyam
 2016: Roshan Meka – Nirmala Convent
 Nikhil Kumar - Jaguar
 Sandeep Kumar - Vangaveeti
 Sagar - Siddhartha
 2017: Ishaan – Rogue
 Aashish Raj – Aakatayi
 Ganta Ravi – Jayadev
 Rakshit – London Babulu
 Vishwak Sen – Vellipomakey
 2018: Kalyaan Dhev – Vijetha
 Aashish Gandhi – Natakam
 Rahul Vijay – Ee Maaya Peremito
 Srinivasa Sayee – Subhalekha + Lu
 Sumanth Sailendra – Brand Babu
2019: Sri Simha – Mathu Vadalara
Anand Deverakonda – Dorasaani
Kiran Abbavaram – Raja Vaaru Rani Gaaru
Meghamsh Srihari – Rajdooth
Vijay Raja – Edaina Jaragocchu
2020: Shiva Kandukuri – Choosi Choodangaane
Sanjay Rao – O Pitta Katha
Ankith Koyya – Johaar
Shravan Reddy – Dirty Hari
Dandamudi Pruthvi – IIT Krishnamurthy

See also 

 Tollywood

References 

South Indian International Movie Awards
Film awards for male debut actors